"Munni Badnaam Hui" is a song from the 2010 Bollywood film Dabangg featuring Malaika Arora Khan along with Sonu Sood and Salman Khan. The song is sung by Mamta Sharma and Aishwarya Nigam, with music by Lalit Pandit. Mamta Sharma won the Filmfare Award for Best Female Playback Singer for this song, while Sajid-Wajid and Lalit Pandit won the Filmfare Award for Best Music Director in the 56th Filmfare Awards 2011.

Due to its popularity, Malaika (and the song itself) was frequently compared to actress Katrina Kaif and her item number "Sheila Ki Jawani" from the 2010 movie Tees Maar Khan.

Influence
The track is said to be inspired by an old Bhojpuri folk song "Launda Badnaam Hua Naseeban Tere Liye". Director Abhinav Kashyap accepted using the folk song saying that he, being from Uttar Pradesh, was familiar with the song since childhood so he suggested the very song to be improvised and rephrased to fit the film's requirement. It was alleged that it was inspired from the Pakistani song "Ladka Badnaam Hua" from the film Mr. Charlie (1992).

Music video

Filming

Synopsis

Reception
The reception by the public and critics was generally positive. Devesh Sharma of Filmfare noted the song's raunchy nature and praised it for its tempo, at the same time criticizing its "nonsensical" lyrics. Atta Khan of Planet Bollywood said "... expect it to explode with Mallaika's entrance on the big screen and chances are, after watching that you may enjoy it..."

"Munni Badnaam Hui" was referred to in many political situations, to varying effects. In October 2010, the Chief Minister of Gujarat Narendra Modi played a pun on the song to criticize his opposition party, the Indian National Congress. It was one of many other popular terms used to criticize the 2010 Commonwealth Games and its organization.

Munni vs. Sheila
After the song "Sheila Ki Jawani" featuring Katrina Kaif was released, parallels were drawn between Katrina and Malaika, as well as between the item numbers, in what was popularly known as the "Munni vs Sheila" debate. Subsequently, newspapers reported increased rivalry between the two actors, which was supposedly highlighted by various incidents. The two were invited to perform their respective numbers at parties and other occasions, adding to the rivalry.

Controversies

Lawsuit by Emami
The popular product by Emami, a pain relieving balm called Zandu Balm is referred to at various times in the song. Emami filed a lawsuit against Arbaaz Khan, the producer of the movie for trademark misuse, but subsequently reached an out of court settlement with the producer. Emami then utilized the popularity of the song to advertise the Zandu Balm brand by signing up Malaika to do commercials.

Public Interest Litigations seeking ban

In December 2010, a Public Interest Litigation (PIL) was filed in the Lucknow bench of the Allahabad High Court, with the petitioner asking for a ban of the song, claiming it was "indecent" and "immoral". Another person also filed a lawsuit in a Sessions court in Mumbai objecting to the use of the word "Hindustan" in the lyrics of the song. The film got a U/A rating from the Censor board of India and was released without any cuts in the song, but the word "Hindustan" in the song was changed to "Policeistan" to avoid any further controversy.

Accolades

Sequel
In the movie Dabangg 2, "Munni Badnaam Hui" has a sequel — "Pandeyjee Seeti Mare" — featuring Malaika Arora with the heroine of the film Sonakshi Sinha. There is another item song named "Fevicol Se" featuring Kareena Kapoor Khan.

In the film Dabangg 3, Sajid-Wajid recreated the song, titled Munna Badnaam Hua which featured Warina Hussain and Salman Khan. The song included a rap by Badshah and is also sung by Mamta Sharma and Kamaal Khan.

References

External links

Hindi film songs
2010 songs
Pop-folk songs
Indian songs